Kim Min-Kyu (born May 14, 1982 in South Korea) is a male South Korean judoka who competed in the half-middleweight category.

He participated in 2005 World Judo Championships, but ended at fifth.

External links 
  Profile at Korea Judo Association

1982 births
Living people
South Korean male judoka
Universiade medalists in judo
Universiade silver medalists for South Korea
21st-century South Korean people